The Vejtables were an American rock band from Millbrae, California, United States. They recorded for the Autumn label and found limited success with such songs as "I Still Love You" and a cover version of Tom Paxton's "The Last Thing on My Mind".

Lead singer Jan Errico also played drums for the group's recordings, making her one of the relatively few female drummers at the time. The Vejtables began their career playing bars and nightclubs along  El Camino Real on the San Francisco Peninsula, even though they were still in high school at the time.

Background
The band's origin was Portola Valley which is south of San Francisco. They started playing together around 1964 A good body of their Autumn recordings were produced by Sly Stone.

Career
From 1964 to 1965 the line up consisted of Ned Hollis on rhythm guitar, organ and backing vocals, Bob Bailey on lead vocals, tambourine, harmonica and percussion, Jan Errico (aka Jan Ashton) on drums and backing vocals, Rick Dey on bass and backing vocals, and Bob Cole on lead guitar.

In May 1965, the band was part of a KYA sponsored concert held at the San Francisco Civic Auditorium. Other acts at the concert were The Beau Brummels, The Byrds, Paul Revere and the Raiders, and The Rolling Stones. Also in 1965, Autumn label boss Tom Donahue had hired Sly Stone to produce the group along with The Great Society, The Mojo Men and The Beau Brummels. By mid to late August, Billboard had predicted that their single "I Still Love You" would reach the Hot 100 chart. It did quite well in Chicago. Debuting on 10 September, it spent three weeks in the charts, peaking at no 23 on the 24th of that month. By October 1965, "I Still Love You" along with others by The Other Tikis, The Mojo Men, and The Beau Brummels appeared in a Billboard advertisement "Autumn Is Here With Big Records Breaking Nationally With  Proven Sales In Major Markets". Also in October 1965, the band was also on the bill of a Tom "Big Daddy" Donahue and Bob Mitchell produced concert at The Cow Palace (San Francisco) that  featuring Little Anthony & The Imperials, Bobby Freeman, The Beau Brummels, The Byrds, Glen Campbell, The Castaways, The Lovin Spoonful, The Mojo Men, Charlie Rich, The Shangri Las, Sonny & Cher, The Sunrays, The Tikis, The Toys, and Roy Head.

In early January 1966, the group was playing at the Nu Beat club in Redwood City which had recently opened. Also that year Autumn went broke and closed which meant the end of their relationship with the label. By the spring of 1966, Errico had already left the band and she was a member of The Mojo Men. Bob Bailey kept the band going while they had some changing line ups. For a short time Bob Mosley who would one day join Moby Grape was a member, but he never recorded with the group. With a change in musical direction to a more psychedelic sound, the group recorded two more singles in 1966 for the Uptown and Tower labels. They were credited as The Book of Changes for their Tower release. The A side of the single was "I Stole The Goodyear Blimp" was a novelty type of single.

Members
Jan Errico actually changed her last name to Ashton because she thought it sounded British. She later left the group because their sound was evolving into a harder psychedelic sound, joining another San Francisco group, the Mojo Men, for which she sang a very audible harmony vocal on their biggest selling single, the Stephen Stills-composed "Sit Down I Think I Love You" from 1967. The Mojo Men eventually shortened their name to Mojo, and released an album and several singles on the GRT label before disbanding.

Personnel
 Jan Errico (Jan Ashton) - drummer, vocals
 Bob Bailey - tambourine, vocals
 Bob Cole - guitar (1965)
 Rick Dey - bass
 Ned Hollis - guitar, organ
 Reese Sheets - guitar
 Frank Smith - bass (1966)
 Jim Sawyers - guitar (1966)
 Richard Fortunato - guitar, vocals (1966)
 Roland Oeler - bass
 Saul Lewis - organ, vocals
 Arthur Penhallow - drums
 Bob Mosley - bass (1966)

Discography

References

Millbrae, California
Musical groups from the San Francisco Bay Area
Psychedelic rock music groups from California
Autumn Records artists